The Tip Sheet (1993–2002) was a weekly magazine and CD insert for UK music industry insiders. Jonathan King founded it and was managing editor until his imprisonment in 2001. His brother, Andy, took over the position, helped by Joe Taylor.

The Tip Sheet promoted artists including The Corrs, The Darkness and Eva Cassidy while they were unsigned or unknown, and publicised future hits like Chumbawamba's Tubthumping, Cognoscenti Vs. Intelligentsia from the Cuban Boys and Who Let the Dogs Out? by Baha Men.

In 2005 The Tip Sheet message board and Record of the Day featured the track No Tomorrow by then-unknown band Orson. Within days the band had several offers. Within weeks they signed a publishing deal with Universal Records worth an estimated £300,000 and a label deal with Mercury Records for a million pounds. The single topped the UK chart, as did their first album.

The Tip Sheet has not been printed since 2002, but an online message board continues. Joe Taylor and fellow-employee Paul Scaife have since been active at Record of the Day, which has similar objectives.

From 1998-2001 the Tip Sheet CD was compiled and mastered by Phil Kerby t/a Audio Edit Productions using the SADiE Portable DAW at the Tip Sheet offices in Chiltern Street, London.

References

External links
Tipsheet Messageboard site

1993 establishments in the United Kingdom
2002 disestablishments in the United Kingdom
Music magazines published in the United Kingdom
Defunct magazines published in the United Kingdom
Magazines established in 1993
Magazines disestablished in 2002